The It Girl is a series of novels created by bestselling novelist Cecily von Ziegesar. The series is ghostwritten from the original idea by von Ziegesar. The series, aimed toward young adults, is a spin-off from the bestselling Gossip Girl series.

Series
 The It Girl (2005)
 Notorious (2006)
 Reckless (2006)
 Unforgettable (2007)
 Lucky (2007)
 Tempted (2008)
 Infamous (2008)
 Adored (2009)
 Devious (2009)
 Classic (2010)
 Dreaming (2010)

Synopsis
Jenny Humphrey is leaving Constance Billard School for girls to attend Waverly Academy, an elite boarding school in New York horse country where glamorous rich kids don't let the rules get in the way of an excellent time. Jenny is determined to leave her crazy Manhattan past behind and become a sophisticated goddess on campus. But first she'll have to contend with her self-absorbed roommates, Callie Vernon and Brett Messerschmidt. Hot guys, intrigue, and gossip all add up to more trouble than ever for Jenny.

Jenny desperately wants to gain Tinsley's acceptance and finally be a part of the popular crowd, but along the way she begins to wonder what price she will have to pay. To make matters worse she falls hard for Callie's estranged boyfriend, Easy, and is forced to choose between the boy she thinks she loves and her new friends.

Characters

Major characters
 Jenny Humphrey, the main character of The It Girl, arrives at Waverly Academy after having been expelled from Manhattan's Constance Billard School for Girls. Jenny is eager to reinvent herself as "New Jenny," a more confident and more popular version of her former self, and to make an impression on her new classmates.
 Callie Vernon, with her strawberry-blond hair and warm hazel eyes, her all-preppy look suits her position as daughter of the governor of Georgia. She was previously involved with Brandon Buchanan before the novels began, but left him for Easy Walsh.
 Brett Lenore Messerschmidt, smart, driven, and an all-rounder aiming to get into Brown, Brett is also one of Waverly's elite. She is originally from New Jersey, but hides the fact that her parents are extremely tasteless with their money.
 Tinsley Adea Carmichael, the leader of Waverly's elite, makes a dramatic return in Notorious, after being unceremoniously kicked out at the end of her sophomore year for getting caught taking ecstasy with Callie Vernon and Brett Messerschmidt
 Easy Walsh, an artsy, good-looking young man with a passion for both art and horseback riding. Much like with Nate Archibald, he comes from an old-money family. He is involved with both Callie and Jenny at various points in the series.
 Brandon Buchanan, who despite being dumped by Callie Vernon for Easy Walsh, he remains hopelessly in love with Callie, hoping to win her back someday

Minor characters
 Heath Ferro, Brandon's roommate is an attractive, wealthy, egotistical womanizer, equally good at being obnoxious and being a gossip as any girl at Waverly. In the first book his nickname is Pony.
 Kara Whalen, Brett's girlfriend and Jenny's close friend. Her mother is a famous fashion designer, which attracts the attention of Tinsley
 Benny Cunningham, a girl with brown hair and brown eyes, is a friend of Tinsley, Callie, and Brett, and Sage's best friend
 Isaac Dresden, the son of the new dean, Dr. Henry Dresden, and brother to Isla Dresden
 Isla Dresden, the daughter of the new dean, Dr. Henry Dresden, and sister to Isaac Dresden. She goes from being Tinsley's best friend to her worst enemy.
 Sage Francis, initially thought to be just another ditzy, blonde, gossiping minion of Callie's. She is best friends with Benny Cunningham.
 Julian McCafferty, who despite being a freshman, hangs out with the junior-year boys in his dorm, usually Heath Ferro and Brandon Buchanan
 Yvonne Stidder, the first girl Jenny meets at Waverly
 Alan St. Girard, the roommate of Easy Walsh
 Alison Quinton, the girlfriend of Alan, and friend of Benny, Sage, Callie, Brett, and Tinsley
 Sebastian Valenti, a student Brett tutors and later falls for

Faculty at Waverly Academy
 Ben Greenwood, the groundskeeper at Waverly
 Mrs. Horniman, one of Waverly's advisors
 Monsieur Lamont, the French teacher at Waverly
 Dean Marymount, a stickler for rules, is the Dean of Waverly up until Devious, after which Dr. Henry Dresden replaces him
 Ms. Nemerov, the tennis coach at Waverly
 Ms. Mariel Pritchard, one of Waverly's advisors
 Ms. Kathryn Rose, Jenny's English teacher
 Coach Smail, the girls' field hockey coach
 Mr. Shepard, head of the theater department
 Professor Dunderdorf, Brandon's and Heath's German teacher
 Ms. Silver, Jenny, Easy, and Alison Quinton's art teacher
 Ms. Angela Paradee, House mother of Dumbarton (the girl's dorm of Tinsley, Jenny, Brett, Callie, Kara, Benny, Sage, Yvonne, Alison, and most of the girls mentioned in the series). Gets caught in an affair with Dean Marymount by Tinsley, Heath, and Callie at the ritz hotel the morning after their party.
 Mr. Eric Dalton, Latin teacher and adviser of Tinsley, Easy, Brett, and Jenny. Was involved with Brett and flirted with Tinsley. Got framed and fired for offering weed to Brett.

References

External links

 Official Site

Novel series
Gossip Girl
Alloy Entertainment